The Australian Energy Market Operator (AEMO) performs an array of gas and electricity market, operational, development and planning functions. It manages the National Electricity Market (NEM), the Wholesale Electricity Market (WA) (WEM) and the Victorian gas transmission network. AEMO also facilitates electricity and gas full retail contestability, overseeing these retail markets in eastern and southern Australia. It is additionally responsible for national transmission planning for electricity and the establishment of a Short Term Trading Market (STTM) for gas.

It commenced operations on 1 July 2009, superseding several state-based and cross-state organisations including the National Electricity Market Management Company Limited (NEMMCO), the Victorian Energy Networks Corporation (VENCorp) which was responsible for the efficient operation of gas and electricity industries in Victoria, the Electricity Supply Industry Planning Council (ESIPC) which was responsible for the effective operation of the electricity industry in South Australia, the South Australian operations of Retail Energy Market Company (REMCo)), Gas Market Company (GMC) and Gas Retail Market Operator (GRMO).

In March 2017, AEMO sought to reassure the public that the closure of the Hazelwood Power Station, which has a capacity of 1600 megawatt, would be offset by the availability of three mothballed gas-fired stations, which have a combined capacity of 830 megawatts, and large industrial businesses agreeing to time-shift their electricity use in the event of an emergency. The addition capacity would be provided by the Pelican Point Power Station in South Australia, Tamar Valley Power Station in Tasmania and Swanbank Power Station in Queensland.

In 2017, AGL Energy reaffirmed that it intends to close the Liddell Power Station in 2022. The closure of this and other coal-burning power stations in Australia has led to the former Prime Minister of Australia, Malcolm Turnbull, to seek advice from AEMO on extending the life of a number of them, to head off future power shortages. Turnbull said the government had been advised that if the Liddell plant were to close in 2022, there would be a 1000MW gap in base load, dispatchable power generation.

In May 2018, AEMO warned solar and wind projects in north-western Victoria of potential curtailment to their generation profiles. In particular, the 220kV transmission line that links Ballarat, Horsham, Red Cliffs, Kerang and Bendigo was the focus of their announcement. "If further development proceeds as suggested, this will add to the thermal constraints in this area", AEMO warns.

AEMO has several departments within such as Engineering and Design, Forecasting, National Planning, Operational forecasting, Markets and Strategies as well as administrative, safety, peopleculture and human resources departments. 
AEMO is the semi-governmental body that acts as the information source for the industry's and manufacturers outlook on the national electricity policies, forecast as well as future plans. The organisation is owned 60% by the Government and 40% by industry and market participants.
AEMO has offices across the country in Melbourne, Brisbane, Sydney, Perth, Adelaide as well as a handful of regional offices.

See also
 Australian Energy Market Commission
 Australian Energy Regulator
 Energy policy of Australia
 Australian Renewable Energy Agency

References

External links
 

Energy policy of Australia
Energy markets